The Sulzberg is a mountain in the Bavarian Alps. It is located between Litzldorf, Großholzhausen and Brannenburg, south of Rosenheim, Bavaria in Germany.

Mountains of Bavaria
Mountains of the Alps
One-thousanders of Germany